Mauritius competed at the 2020 Summer Paralympics in Tokyo, Japan, from 24 August to 5 September 2021.

Athletics 

Track

Field

See also
 Mauritius at the 2020 Summer Olympics

References

Nations at the 2020 Summer Paralympics
2021 in Mauritian sport
2020